The Wall Tour was a concert tour by the English progressive rock band Pink Floyd throughout 1980–1981 in support of their concept album The Wall.

The tour was relatively small compared to previous tours for a major release, with only 31 shows in total. The tour was notable for its extensive use of stage theatrics, most notably a giant wall constructed across the stage to convey the sense of alienation present in both the album, and Roger Waters' personal feelings at the time.

This was the last tour of Pink Floyd with Roger Waters. 17 June 1981 was the last concert of the tour, and the last concert with Waters (until 2 July 2005 at Live 8 24 years later).

Background

"I was struck by the thought that there was a huge wall, that you couldn't see, between me and the audience," explained Roger Waters. "Then I drew it and started to talk to people about it. And they thought I was mad, because my original idea was to start building a wall at the beginning of the show and, when it's finished, they can't see you or hear you any more, and then the show is over."

The tour's costs were estimated to have reached US$1.5 million even before the first performance (equivalent to US$4.7 million as of 2021). The New York Times stated in its 2 March 1980 edition: "The Wall show remains a milestone in rock history though and there's no point in denying it. Never again will one be able to accept the technical clumsiness, distorted sound and meagre visuals of most arena rock concerts as inevitable." It concluded, "The Wall show will be the touchstone against which all future rock spectacles must be measured."

Nick Mason explained:

The concert was performed just 31 times in four cities: Los Angeles (7 shows), Uniondale (5), Dortmund (8) and London (11). The primary 'tour' consisted of 18 shows in L.A., Uniondale and London in 1980, but the band performed a further eight shows in Dortmund (13–20 February 1981) and five more shows at Earl's Court (13–17 June) for filming, with the intention of integrating the shows into the upcoming movie.

The London shows are documented on the album Is There Anybody Out There? The Wall Live 1980-81.

David Gilmour and Mason attempted to convince Waters to expand the show for a more lucrative, large-scale stadium tour, but because of the nature of the material (one of the primary themes is the distance between an artist and his audience) Waters balked at this.

Discord in the band
On tour, relations between Gilmour, Mason, Waters and Richard Wright were at an all-time low: their four Winnebagos were parked in a circle with the doors facing away from the centre; an isolated Waters used his own vehicle to arrive at each venue and stayed in separate hotels from Gilmour, Mason and Wright. Despite having left the band upon completion of the album, Wright agreed to complete the tour as a salaried musician, and consequently ended up being the only member of the group who made any money from the venture. "I did not just want to walk out on this great thing I'd been working on," he recalled. "I just decided I'd go out and play my best, possibly with the hope that, if it worked out, [Waters'] decision to have me out could have been reverted."

Concert film

The idea to include live concert footage of any significant length for The Wall film was dropped shortly before the final shows took place. There are conflicting statements regarding the professionally filmed footage. It had been widely believed that 'the wrong type of film' had been used and the results were dark and murky. Mark Fisher, partly responsible for designing the show said the footage was: 'very dark and horrible and boring and should be burned'. Alan Parker himself said: '[the filming of the shows were] five blown opportunities'. These rumours were partially scotched when the Channel 4 documentary 'Behind the Wall' (2000) used perfectly clear footage from the 1981 concerts. 27 February and 9 August 1980 concerts were shot on videotape. David Gilmour has stated in an interview that only three tracks were captured on film:

Roger Waters said on an episode of In the Studio with Redbeard which devoted two parts to the making of The Wall that "the London shows in 1980/81 were filmed and he had all of the footage and was thinking of putting it together to be released. However felt extremely reluctant to release the concerts on the video cassette format". He also would have to refer to the shows as a document of what went on.

In the December 2009 issue of Mojo, Roger Waters revealed that he had 'discovered a whole load of new footage of The Wall shows' and was busy 'editing it'. He explained that he assumed the cameramen decided to shoot more than they were asked to as they had the cameras and "nobody [seemed] bothered". Waters has stated that the film is 70 mm. In Rolling Stone magazine, Waters expresses that the footage would "undoubtedly" be released to the public.

During Waters' tour of The Wall in 2010 footage of Waters performing his vocal parts in "Mother", labelled as being filmed in Earls Court in 1980, was projected onto the incomplete wall.

DVD of The Wall Immersion Box Set includes the professionally shot 70mm footage of "The Happiest Days of Our Lives" at Earls Court, 1981, with mixed footage from 13–17 June. The footage seen on the bootleg Divided We Fall by Harvested DVD is from 6–9 August 1980, while the audio is soundboard from 8 August in the first set, and 9 August in the second set.

Personnel 
David Gilmour – electric and acoustic guitars, vocals, mandolin on "Outside the Wall", musical director
Nick Mason – drums, percussion, acoustic guitar on "Outside the Wall"
Roger Waters – bass guitar, vocals, acoustic guitar on "Mother", clarinet on "Outside the Wall"
Richard Wright – piano, organ, synthesiser, accordion on "Outside The Wall"

with:
Andy Bown – bass guitar, acoustic guitar on "Outside the Wall"
Snowy White – guitars (1980 shows)
Andy Roberts – guitars (1981 shows)
Willie Wilson – drums, percussion
Clive Brooks – drums, percussion (Nick Mason's drum tech replaced Willie Wilson on 13–14 June 1981)
Peter Wood – keyboards, acoustic guitar on "Outside the Wall"
Joe Chemay – backing vocals
Stan Farber – backing vocals
Jim Haas – backing vocals
John Joyce – backing vocals
Gary Yudman – MC (New York and London)
Cynthia Fox – MC (Los Angeles)
Jim Ladd- MC (Los Angeles)
Ace Young – MC (Los Angeles)
Willi Thomczyk – MC (Dortmund)

Set list
The 1980/1981 set lists comprised the entire album, The Wall. The songs that did not make it onto the album, "What Shall We Do Now?", as well as an extra verse in "The Show Must Go On", and the then-untitled "The Last Few Bricks", were also played.

First set
"In the Flesh?" 
"The Thin Ice" 
"Another Brick in the Wall, Part 1" 
"The Happiest Days of Our Lives"
"Another Brick in the Wall, Part 2"
"Mother" 
"Goodbye Blue Sky" 
"Empty Spaces"
"What Shall We Do Now?"
"Young Lust"
"One of My Turns" 
"Don't Leave Me Now"
"Another Brick in the Wall, Part 3" 
"The Last Few Bricks"
"Goodbye Cruel World"

Second set
"Hey You"
"Is There Anybody Out There?" 
"Nobody Home"
"Vera"
"Bring the Boys Back Home"
"Comfortably Numb" 
"The Show Must Go On" 
"In the Flesh"
"Run Like Hell" 
"Waiting for the Worms"
"Stop"
"The Trial" 
"Outside the Wall"

Tour dates

References

Citations

Sources

External links
Pinkfloydz.com

Pink Floyd concert tours
1980 concert tours
1981 concert tours
The Wall (rock opera)